Umaro Baldé (born 7 October 2002) is a footballer who plays as a midfielder. Born in Guinea-Bissau, he represented Portugal at youth international level.

Early life
Baldé grew up in Quelele, Guinea-Bissau in poverty, with his family moving to Portugal when he was eight or nine for a better lifestyle. At the age of 12, Balde joined the youth academy of Portuguese fifth tier side Damaiense. After impressing in a match against the Sporting CP Youth Academy in a tournament, he was asked to join their program. In 2019, he left Sporting.

In 2019, he signed a contract with Scottish club Rangers' youth academy, joining on a two-year contract. He made his U18 debut in a pre-season friendly against Partick Thistle on 8 July. Playing mainly with the U18 squad, he appeared for the club in UEFA Youth League matches, as well as the reserve team. He left the club by mutual consent on 1 February 2021. After departing Rangers, he returned to Portugal and then participated in a two month intensive training program with Prestige Sports to maintain fitness.

Club career
In early 2022, he went on trial with Canadian Premier League club Pacific FC during their pre-season. On 16 March 2022, Balde signed his first professional contract with Pacific for the 2022 season. On 28 May, he debuted for Pacific FC during a 2–2 draw with Valour FC. At the end of the year, Baldé departed the club.

International career
He represented Portugal at the U15 and U16 levels. In 2020, he was called up to a camp for the Portugal U18 team.

References

External links
 
 

2002 births
Living people
Bissau-Guinean emigrants to Portugal
Portuguese sportspeople of Bissau-Guinean descent
Portuguese footballers
Bissau-Guinean footballers
Association football midfielders
Portugal youth international footballers
Canadian Premier League players
Sporting CP footballers
Rangers F.C. players
Pacific FC players
Bissau-Guinean expatriate footballers
Portuguese expatriate footballers
Expatriate footballers in Scotland
Bissau-Guinean expatriate sportspeople in Scotland
Portuguese expatriate sportspeople in Scotland
Expatriate soccer players in Canada
Bissau-Guinean expatriate sportspeople in Canada
Portuguese expatriate sportspeople in Canada